American Constitutional Initiative (commonly known as ACI) is a non-profit advocacy group that defines its mission as promoting intellectually sound change to American legal and political landscape.  ACI employs research, lobbying, and direct-appeal campaigns to advocate a progressive vision of America's Constitution and laws.

References

Think tanks based in the United States